Dartchery at the 1980 Summer Paralympics consisted of three events.

Medal summary

References 

 

1980 Summer Paralympics events
1980